Pavel Řezníček (30 January 1942 – 19 September 2018) was a Czech writer and surrealist poet. In addition to his writing career he also translated from French (Joyce Mansour, Ambroise Vollard, Benjamin Péret and others). He finished a secondary school in 1959. Since 1965 he worked in many manual professions. Since 1970's, he lived in Prague; and since 2002, he was a pensioner.

Bibliography 

Many of his books were first published outside of (then) Czechoslovakia, before coming into print in his home country.

Poetry

 Blbec, 1986 (L'Imbécile)
 Kráter Resnik a jiné básně, 1990
 Tabákové vejce, 1991
 Plovací sval, 1995
 Hrozba výtahu, 2001
 Atentát ve vaně, 2002
 Kakodémonický kartáč, 2006

Prose

 Strop, outside Czechoslovakia 1983, in Czechoslovakia 1991
 Vedro, 1993
 Zvířata, 1993
 Alexandr v tramvaji, 1994
 Zrcadlový pes, 1994
 Cerf volant, 1995
 Holič a boty, 1997
 Natrhneš nehtem hlavy jejich, 2003

Works dedicated to the Brno underground

 Hvězdy kvelbu, 1992
 Popel žhne, 1996
 Blázny šatí stvol, 1998

Works in English 
 "Watches" (story) in The Cafe Irreal

External links 
 Profile in Czech

1942 births
2018 deaths
People from Blansko
Czech poets
Czech male poets
Czech surrealist writers
Czech translators
French–Czech translators
20th-century translators